Robert "Bobby" Limb AO, OBE (10 November 1924 – 11 September 1999) was an Australian-born entertainment pioneer, comedian, band leader and musician and legend of radio, television and theatre of the 1960s and 1970s, he also founded the film and TV production company NLT Productions, with Jack Neary and Les Tinker. One of its main products was adventure serial The Rovers, which was aimed at breaking the international market.

Early days 
Bobby Limb was born in Adelaide, South Australia and entered a show business career beginning in 1941, at the age of 17, when he became a saxophone player with various dance bands around his home city of Adelaide. His bright personality soon made him a bandleader and comedian. By 1952, Bobby was already one of Australia's leading entertainers, with a fan-club on radio station 2UW, which boasted 35,000 teenage members.

Radio and television host
He appeared in the satirical radio program The Idiot Weekly in 1958 and 1959, alongside such players as Spike Milligan, Ray Barrett and John Bluthal and  John Ewart but was better known for his own radio, and later TV shows.

His most successful television shows were The Mobil Limb Show, Australia's first national television show, and Bobby Limb's The Sound of Music, which ran for nine years 1963–1972, being the country's top-rated show for most of that time.  Limb switched with his program from TCN Channel 9 to TEN10 in exactly the same timeslot on Friday nights.  Channel 9 then picked up the younger Barry Crocker from TEN10 where he'd been hosting a similar program called "Say it with Music", and placed this into almost exactly the same timeslot with the same "Sound of Music" name on Friday nights.  Crocker's initial success waned, but both versions were axed within a few years as the format had had its run.

Marriage 
Bobby Limb married fellow entertainer Dawn Lake in 1953, and often appeared with her.  As a couple, they became iconic within the Australian entertainment industry.  So popular was their appeal in their native land that Bert Newton even called them "Australia's Lucille and Desi".

Support and foundations 
He promoted and supported young musicians, such as the group Human Nature.

He supported Diabetes Australia, and founded the Bobby Limb Foundation to help sufferers of diabetes.

Death and legacy 
On 11 September 1999, Bobby Limb died of cancer, a condition he had previously suffered and apparently beaten.  At Limb's funeral, the former Whitlam government minister Doug McClelland said that Bobby Limb was to the Australian entertainment industry what Sir Donald Bradman was to cricket, Sir Charles Kingsford Smith was to aviation, Dame Joan Sutherland was to opera, and Dr Victor Chang was to surgery.

Popular appeal

Bobby Limb's enduring popularity was based on a solid 'middle-of-the-road' musical format, knock-about (never 'way-out') comedy, and a 'something for the whole family' style wholesomeness. In the late 1950s, Limb took up the torch of supplying middle-Australia's tastes in entertainment from that of radio personality of Jack Davey, but Limb's star began to fade in the 1970s when the TV audience shifted its tastes away from family 'variety' shows towards wall-to-wall 80's style pop-music, home-grown soap-opera like A Country Practice and Neighbours and most especially harder-edged, satirical comedy like The Aunty Jack Show.

Bobby Limb remained a hit with older Australian audiences but his later appearances were almost entirely off-screen, held at various live venues around the nation, like clubs and theatres, often in connection with charity fund-raising.

Limb released several recordings showcasing his musicianship, including  "Bobby Limb's 'Sound Of Music' Soundtrack", "Honeycomb", "Bobby Limb's Family Favourites" and "Mockingbird Hill".

Conversion to Christianity 
In 1983, following many professional and personal problems, Bobby Limb became a born-again Christian.

Awards 
He won a total of 11 Logie Awards, including the 1964 Gold Logie, awarded to the Most Popular Personality on Australian Television.

He won a Mr Show Business award in the USA.

In 1983, he won the Australian Father of the Year award.

British and Australian honours 
In 1967 he was made an Officer of the Order of the British Empire (OBE) for his efforts in entertaining Australian troops in the Vietnam War.  In 2000, nine months after his death, he was appointed an Officer of the Order of Australia (AO) "For service to the Australian entertainment industry, to tourism, and to the community, particularly through support for charitable organisations". Although announced posthumously, the award was made with effect from 2 September 1999.

Selected programs
'

References 

Life and Limb: the highlights and traumas of Bobby Limb's days in TV and Show Biz. Judy Judd: Horwitz Grahame, 1987.
Article about Limb by Cynthia Banham, Sydney Morning Herald, 12 June 2000

External links

1924 births
1999 deaths
Gold Logie winners
Australian male television actors
Australian television presenters
Television pioneers
Deaths from cancer in New South Wales
Officers of the Order of Australia
Australian Officers of the Order of the British Empire
20th-century Australian male actors
Australian film studio executives